Naser Al-Othman (born 14 January 1977) is a Kuwaiti footballer. He competed in the 2000 Summer Olympics.

References

External links
 

1977 births
Living people
Footballers at the 2000 Summer Olympics
Kuwaiti footballers
Olympic footballers of Kuwait
Association football defenders
Asian Games medalists in football
Footballers at the 1998 Asian Games
Asian Games silver medalists for Kuwait
Medalists at the 1998 Asian Games
Al Salmiya SC players
Kuwait Premier League players
Burgan SC players
Al Tadhamon SC players